Société Dargaud, doing business as Les Éditions Dargaud, is a publisher of Franco-Belgian comics series, headquartered in the 18th arrondissement of Paris. It was founded in 1936 by Georges Dargaud, publishing its first comics in 1943.

History 
Initially, Dargaud published novels for women. In 1948, it started Line, a "magazine for elegant women", as well as a French edition of the Belgian Tintin magazine.

In 1960, Dargaud bought the weekly Pilote magazine from René Goscinny, Albert Uderzo, and Jean-Michel Charlier. Goscinny continued as editor of the magazine, and Charlier was album editor for a period. In October 1961, Dargaud published the first Asterix album.

In 1974, Dargaud wanted to diversify. Pilote became a monthly magazine and spawned two other monthly magazines. The new magazines were Lucky Luke Mensuel (a Western themed magazine around the series Lucky Luke) and Achille Talon Magazine (a humor based magazine around the series Achille Talon). However, both magazines could not sustain a readership and folded within a year. The comics from these two magazines were put back into Pilote.

In 1988, Dargaud was acquired by Média-Participations. Two years later, it sold the weekly gardening and do-it-yourself magazine Rustica to Média-Participations as well.

In 1992, the publisher Le Lombard became a part of Dargaud, followed in 1993 by Les Éditions Blake et Mortimer. Over the course of the 1990s, Dargaud subsequently acquired several audiovisual production companies, including Citel in 1994, Marina Productions in 1997, and Millésime Productions in 1998. The latter two, specialized in television animation, joined in 1999 to create Dargaud Marina, later renamed Dargaud Media.

At the end of the 1990s, Dargaud created manga publisher Kana, followed by Lucky Comics, centered on the series Lucky Luke.

In 2003, Dargaud acquired the production studio Ellipsanime, holder of one of the most extensive catalogues of European cartoons (including Tintin and Babar).

In 2008, Dargaud founded the foreign rights agency Mediatoon Licensing, and in 2015, it joined with twelve other European comics publishing actors to create Europe Comics, a digital initiative co-funded by the European Commission's Creative Europe program.

In 2014, Dargaud acquired the assets of the now defunct Moonscoop Group, which includes the rights to series such as Hero: 108 and Code Lyoko.

Selected titles
 Asterix - Albert Uderzo and René Goscinny
 Barbe rouge - Jean-Michel Charlier, Victor Hubinon etc.
 Black Moon Chronicles - Olivier Ledroit and François Marcela-Froideval
 Blacksad - Juan Diaz Canales and Juanjo Guarnido
 Blake and Mortimer - Edgar Pierre Jacobs etc.
 Blueberry - Jean-Michel Charlier, Jean Giraud etc.
 Djinn - Jean Dufaux and Ana Mirallès
 Lucky Luke - Morris, René Goscinny etc.
 Philemon - Fred
 Tanguy et Laverdure - Jean-Michel Charlier, Albert Uderzo, Jijé etc.
 The Vagabond of Limbo - Christian Godard, Julio Ribera
 Valérian - Pierre Christin and Jean-Claude Mézières
 XIII - Jean van Hamme and William Vance

References

External links

  

 
French companies established in 1936
Comic book publishing companies of France